"Sugar Moon" is a Western swing love song written by Bob Wills and Cindy Walker. 

The song was first recorded by Bob Wills and The Texas Playboys in 1947 (Columbia 37313), where it reached number one, staying on the charts six weeks.

Lyrics
The title comes from a refrain in the chorus:

Cover versions
It has been covered by other artists including: 
k.d. lang covered it on her Shadowland album (1988)
Asleep at the Wheel
Willie Nelson

Citations

References
Whitburn, Joel. The Billboard Book of Top 40 Country Hits. Billboard Books, 2006. 

Western swing songs
1947 songs
1947 singles
Bob Wills songs
Songs written by Cindy Walker
Songs written by Bob Wills